The Faculty of Intensive Care Medicine is the organisation involved with the training, assessment, practice and continuing professional development of Intensive care medicine consultants in the United Kingdom. The current Dean is Dr Alison Pittard. The Faculty is based at Churchill House, London.

The Faculty has seven parent Colleges, reflecting the multiprofessional nature of ICM.
 Royal College of Anaesthetists, which acts as lead governance College of the Faculty.
 Royal College of Emergency Medicine
 Royal College of Physicians of Edinburgh
 Royal College of Physicians of London
 Royal College of Physicians and Surgeons of Glasgow
 Royal College of Surgeons of Edinburgh
 Royal College of Surgeons of England

On 22 November 2010, Professor Julian Bion was admitted as the first Dean of the new faculty.

As of January 2015 the faculty has 1901 Fellows and Members and 129 trainees.

References

External links
 

Health in the London Borough of Camden
Intensive care organizations
Medical associations based in the United Kingdom
Organisations based in the London Borough of Camden